Nehemiah Platt (July 25, 1797 – March 29, 1851) was an American politician from New York.

Life
He married Diantha Wilson (1804–1866), and they had several children. He was Supervisor of the Town of Nichols from 1825 to 1827.

He was a member of the New York State Senate (3rd D.) from 1841 to 1844, sitting in the 64th, 65th, 66th and 67th New York State Legislatures.

U.S. Senator Thomas C. Platt (1833–1910) was his nephew.

Sources
The New York Civil List compiled by Franklin Benjamin Hough (pages 133f and 144; Weed, Parsons and Co., 1858)
History of Nichols, NY transcribed at Ray's History

External links

1797 births
1851 deaths
New York (state) state senators
People from Nichols, New York
New York (state) Whigs
19th-century American politicians